Scott Mann may refer to:
 Scott Mann (director), British film and television director
 Scott Mann (politician), British politician
 D. Scott Mann, retired U.S. Special Forces lieutenant colonel and author